The Masa languages are a group of closely related Chadic languages of southwestern Chad and northern Cameroon.

Languages
The Masa languages listed in Blench (2006) are:

North
Massa (Masana)
? Zumaya (†)
Musey–Azumeina
Musey
Azumeina (Marba)
South
Mesmé
Peve–Kaɗo
Pévé
Ngeté-Herdé

The exonym Zime is used for the Herdé, Ngeté, Pévé, and Mesmé. Similarly, Kaɗo is a generic name for the Peve–Kaɗo languages, a couple of which are called Lamé as well.

Shryock (1997)
Shryock (1997: 32) subgroups the Masa languages as:
Zumaya
North: Masa; Musey; Marba, Monogoy
South: Zime; Peve; Heɗe-Ngiɗe

Numerals
Comparison of numerals in individual languages:

See also
List of Proto-Masa reconstructions (Wiktionary)

References

External links
 Masa Chadic resources at africanlanguages.org

Chadic languages
Languages of Cameroon
Languages of Chad